Goodaver, Goodaver stone circle or Goodaver circle is a stone circle located in the parish of Altarnun, near Bolventor on Bodmin Moor in Cornwall, UK.

Description
Reverend A. H. Malan discovered the circle in 1906 when only three stones remained standing. Local farmers supplied workers to erect the fallen stones in their current position and it is clear that several stones were inverted, spaced incorrectly with some reversed faces and possibly in the wrong places.

Archaeology
Stones may have been removed for use in adjacent dry stone walls as it has been damaged on the northern side. There are also some remaining hut circles in the area showing signs of ancient settlement.

Literature

References

External links
 Illustrated entry in the Megalithic Portal
 Illustrated entry in the Modern Antiquarian
 Pastscape – English Heritage entry about Goodaver stone circle
 

Bodmin Moor
Stone circles in Cornwall